The Treaty of Trentschin was concluded on 24 August 1335 between King Casimir III of Poland and King John of Bohemia as well as his son Margrave Charles IV. The agreement was reached by the agency of Casimir's brother-in-law King Charles I of Hungary and signed at Trencsén Castle in the Kingdom of Hungary (present-day Trenčín, Slovakia). It initiated the transfer of suzerainty over the former Polish province of Silesia to the Kingdom of Bohemia, whereafter the Duchies of Silesia were incorporated into the Bohemian Crown.

Prelude

Shortly before his death in 992, Mieszko I, the first ruler of Poland, had conquered the Silesian region stretching along the common border. At Pentecost 1137 Duke Soběslav I of Bohemia, urged by Emperor Lothair III, had officially renounced the lands in favour of the Piast duke Bolesław III Wrymouth. Bolesław died the next year, and in his testament bequested the newly established Duchy of Silesia to his eldest son Władysław II. Władysław, however, was expelled by his younger half-brothers and had to seek help from the Holy Roman Emperor—the beginning of a gradual alienation. The rule of his eldest son Duke Bolesław I over Silesia was restored under pressure from Emperor Frederick Barbarossa in 1163; Bolesław's son Henry the Bearded even became High Duke of Poland in 1232. The marriage of his successor Duke Henry II the Pious with Anne of Bohemia, daughter of King Ottokar I, strengthened the ties between the Silesian Piasts and the Bohemian Přemyslid dynasty. However, after Henry's death in the 1241 Battle of Legnica, Silesia by and by split into numerous petty states under his descendants.

In 1280 Duke Henry IV of Wrocław, induced by his ambition to gain the Polish Seniorate Province of Cracow, had paid homage to King Rudolf I of Germany and indeed was able to succeed Leszek II the Black as Polish high duke in 1288. Meanwhile, considering the weakening of the Polish sovereignty, the occasion arose for the Přemyslids to once again expand their sphere of influence into Silesia: in 1289 King Wenceslaus II of Bohemia made Duke Casimir of Bytom his vassal and in the renewed struggle over the Polish Seniorate Province upon the sudden death of Duke Henry IV in 1290 forged an alliance with Casimir's brother Bolko I of Opole against the rivaling Polish Piasts Władysław I the Elbow-high and Przemysł II, who finally had to cede Cracow to the Bohemian king one year later. However, King Wenceslaus at first failed to gain Polish regality, as Przemysł II became High Duke and was crowned in 1295 by Archbishop Jakub Świnka of Gniezno—the first Polish king after the deposition of Bolesław II the Bold in 1079. When Przemysł II was killed in 1296, Wenceslaus II again took the chance, assumed the title of a High Duke, married Przemysł's daughter Elisabeth Richeza and finally was crowned Polish king by Archbishop Jakub Świnka in 1300.

In 1305 King Wenceslaus II died and his son Wenceslaus III, the last Přemyslid ruler, was murdered in the following year. The Polish sovereignty turned again to the Piast dynasty, when Władysław I the Elbow-high began to unite the kingdom under his rule. Wenceslaus' successors in Bohemia, Henry of Carinthia and Rudolph of Austria also claimed the title of a Polish king, but could not prevail. While Władysław was crowned king in 1320, the Bohemian aspirations to power rose again when in 1310 Count John of Luxembourg, the eldest son of King Henry VII of Germany, married the Přemyslid princess Elizabeth, taking over the power in Prague and also the claims to the Polish throne. Though he failed to succeed his father as King of the Romans, he had more Silesian dukes swore an oath of allegiance to him, against the resistance of King Władysław: in 1327 he vassalized the dukes of Wrocław and Opole, followed by the dukes of Legnica, Żagań, Oleśnica, Ścinawa und Brzeg in 1329. The tensions intensified when King John campaigned and annexed the Silesian Duchy of Głogów in 1331 and began to interfere in the Polish-Teutonic War that broke out in Kuyavia and Dobrzyń Land in the aftermath of the 1308 takeover of Gdańsk.

The treaty

In 1333 the Polish king Władysław was succeeded by his son Casimir III, who was prepared for compromise: he resorted to sue the Teutonic Order at the Roman Curia and settled the rising conflict with King John of Bohemia by the provisory Trentschin treaty on St Bartholomew's Day 1335: the representatives of the Polish king "in perpetuity" renounced all claims to Silesia in favour of Bohemia, while King John and his son Charles in turn finally waived their claims to the Polish throne derived from the Přemyslids. The agreement was to be confirmed, when the rulers met at the Congress of Visegrád later in November 1335. 

King John now had a free hand to continue vassalizing the Silesian duchies of Ziębice/Münsterberg  (1336) and Nysa/Neisse (1342). It was however not until February 9, 1339 that Casimir ratified the treaty in Kraków, however. The agreement was again reaffirmed for the Holy Roman Empire by John's son Charles IV, elected King of the Romans in 1346, in the 1348 Treaty of Namslau with King Casimir III and again in 1372 by Casimir's successor King Louis I.

Bolko II the Small remained the only Silesian duke, who was not content to accept Bohemian overlordship. However, as he had no male heirs and his niece Anna von Schweidnitz had married Emperor Charles IV in 1353, he signed an inheritance treaty, whereafter upon the death of his widow Agnes of Austria in 1392 his Duchy of Jawor finally fell to Bohemia.

Aftermath

With the Treaty of Trentschin, the split of Silesia off the Polish Crown was made. In 1348 King Charles IV attached it to the Bohemian crown lands together with Moravia and the Lusatias, whereby the Silesian dukes became indirect vassals of the Holy Roman Empire, though with no immediate status and no representation at the Imperial Diet. According to canon law, however, the Diocese of Wrocław remained a suffragan of the Polish Archdiocese of Gniezno. While the Silesian lands also comprised the former Moravian Duchy of Opava, the Upper Silesian duchies of Siewierz, Oświęcim and Zator were acquired by Poland in the 15th century. The Lower Silesian duchy of Krosno fell to Brandenburg in 1476.

Upon the death of the Bohemian king Louis II at the 1526 Battle of Mohács, his crown lands were inherited by the Habsburg king Ferdinand I and became a constituent of the Habsburg monarchy. Archduchess Maria Theresa, Bohemian queen from 1740, lost most of the Silesian crown land in the 1742 Treaty of Breslau, after it had been conquered by King Frederick II of Prussia. The bulk of Silesia returned to the Republic of Poland upon the implementation of the Oder–Neisse line according to the 1945 Potsdam Agreement.

See also
History of Silesia
Congress of Visegrád (1335)
Treaty of Namslau

1335 in Europe
Treaty of Trentschin
Treaty of Trentschin
Trentschin
Treaties of the Kingdom of Poland (1025–1385)
Treaties of the Kingdom of Hungary (1000–1918)
Treaties of the Kingdom of Bohemia